ePathshala  is a portal/app developed by the CIET, and NCERT. It was initiated jointly by the Ministry of Human Resource Development, CIET, and NCERT, and launched in November 2015. It hosts educational resources for teachers, students, parents, researchers and educators, can be accessed on the Web, and is available on Google Play, App Store and Windows.  The content is available in English, Hindi and Urdu.

The platform offers a slew of educational resources, including NCERT textbooks for classes 1-12, audio-visual resources by NCERT, periodicals, supplements, teacher training modules and a variety of other print and non-print materials. These materials can be downloaded by the user for offline use with no limits on downloads. The app supports flip book format to provide a more realistic experience.

References

External links
Official Website
NCERT Website
Ministry of Human Resource Development

Indian educational websites
Multilingual websites
Modi administration initiatives
Internet properties established in 2015
Digital India initiatives
Computer-related introductions in 2015
E-learning in India
Government-owned websites of India
Distance education institutions based in India
Education companies of India
Online tutoring
Virtual learning environments